Riek is a surname and given name

Notable people with the name include:

as a surname:

 Edgar Frederick Riek (1920–2016), Australian entomologist 
Gustav Riek (1900–1976), German archaeologist
Sarah-Lorraine Riek (born 1992)  German actress and model

as a given name:

 Riek Schagen (1913–2008), Dutch actress and painter
Riek Machar (born 1953),South Sudanese politician
Riek Gai Kok, South Sudanese politician

See also 

Reik (surname)

Surnames from given names